Kara Richards (born 25 January 1988) is an Australian netball player in the ANZ Championship, playing for the Melbourne Vixens.

After failing to make the Adelaide Thunderbirds 2012 list she is currently working as a Netball Coach alongside Wendy Jones (Former Vixen), Kristy Keppich Birrel (Victoria Fury Ass. Coach) & Ashlee Howard (Former Melbourne Vixen and West Coast Fever player) at the Rowville Sports Academy.

References

1988 births
Living people
Australian netball players
Melbourne Vixens players
ANZ Championship players
Victorian Netball League players
Netball players from Victoria (Australia)
Australian netball coaches
Victorian Fury players
Australian Institute of Sport netball players
Australian Netball League players
Adelaide Thunderbirds players